Robert P. "Fuzzy" Vandivier (December 26, 1903 – July 30, 1983) was an American high school and collegiate basketball player during the 1920s. 

At Franklin High School he led a squad nicknamed "Franklin Wonder Five", a team that compiled an 89-9 record, won three state championships (1920, 1921, 1922) and is considered the greatest Indiana High School team of all-time. 

Vandivier was named All-State three times (1920, 1921, 1922), becoming the first player ever to achieve this feat (since then, John Wooden, Oscar Robertson and George McGinnis also achieved this level of success). Hall of Fame coach John Wooden considered Vandivier the greatest high school basketball player of all time.

Following his outstanding high school career, Vandivier attended local Franklin College (1922–26). In each year he was named All-State, and in 1926 he was an All-Midwest College All-Star. Due to a painful back ailment in his senior year, Vandivier's playing career was cut short. After graduating from Franklin, he returned as basketball coach to his high school.  Vandivier coached the Franklin High School basketball team from 1926 to 1944.  In 1939, under his leadership, they earned a place in the Indiana state finals.

1903 births
1983 deaths
Basketball players from Indiana
Franklin Grizzlies men's basketball players
High school basketball coaches in the United States
Naismith Memorial Basketball Hall of Fame inductees
National Collegiate Basketball Hall of Fame inductees
People from Franklin County, Indiana